Jack Currie (born 16 December 2001) is an English professional footballer who plays as a defender for AFC Wimbledon.

Early life
Currie attended the St Lawrence Junior School in East Molesey alongside Wimbledon teammate Elliott Bolton. He joined the Wimbledon academy when he was 10 years-old. He signed his first professional contract with Wimbledon in September 2020.

Career

Non-league loans
In February 2021 Currie joined Maidstone United on a 6-month loan, however the 2020–21 season for Maidstone was curtailed due to the COVID-19 pandemic. Having also spent time on loan at Leatherhead, the following season he joined Eastbourne Borough of the National League South on loan in July 2021. Currie won the players’ player of the season award at the end of the 2021–22 season.

2022: Goalscoring League Debut 
Currie made his senior league debut at left-back for Wimbledon on the opening day of the 2022-23 season, a 2-0 win over Gillingham F.C. at Plough Lane on 30 July, 2022 scoring the second goal. He described it as “what you dream of as a kid”. Currie made 32 appearances in all competitions for Wimbledon by January 2023, and was reportedly the subject of transfer offers from EFL Championship side Bristol City in the January 2023 transfer window. Currie had been spoken about positively by then Bristol City player Ryley Towler when he was on-loan at Wimbledon. Wimbledon rejected a number of bids for Currie on transfer deadline day  31 January, 2023.

Career statistics

References

2001 births
Living people
AFC Wimbledon players
Leatherhead F.C. players
Eastbourne Borough F.C. players
English footballers
Association football defenders